Dil Toh Deewana Hai is a 2016 Indian Hindi-language romantic comedy film directed by Raja Bundela and produced by Deepak Sharma and Aradhana Sharma. The film features Hyder Khan, Raj Babbar, Zeenat Aman, Sadha and Sushmita Mukherjee. The film music and score was composed by the Bollywood singer Zubeen Garg.

The film was intended for release in 2009 and was initially rescheduled for 2013. Finally it was released  June 23, 2016. It was considered a commercial failure.

Plot
Raja (Hyder Khan) is a guy who has always remained a 'good friend' to most of the girls, that is if they have not already beaten him up! He has always been shy, never to open his heart out. Raja meets the girl of his dreams Anamika (Sada) in tube in Malaysia. She is a spoilt, arrogant daughter of a billionaire in Malaysia. As days pass, Raja gets more and more hooked on to her and expresses his feelings to her. This is when his life takes a different turn and he is left on the thresholds of life

Cast
 Hyder Khan
 Raj Babbar
 Zeenat Aman
 Sadha
 Sushmita Mukherjee
 Alok Nath
 Hemant Pandey
 Mohsin Khan
 Shabnam Kapoor
 Gaurav Ghai
 Shweeta Giri
 Mobin Khan
 Gauri Sharma

Music

The music for Dil Toh Deewana Hai is composed by Zubeen Garg and Anand Raj Anand while the lyrics are written by Kumar Vishwas and Ibrahim Ashk. The music rights are acquired by Zee Music Company. The song is produced by Deepak Sharma and Aradhana Sharma. The full music album was released on 1 June 2016.

The film was supposed to released on 2009 and then it was rescheduled to 2013 and finally it released on June 23, 2016 for which the music became outdated in 2016 as its being composed and sung in around 2009-08.

References

External links
 category:

2016 films
2010s Hindi-language films
2016 romantic comedy films
Indian romantic comedy films
Films scored by Anand Raj Anand